Actinoplanes bogorensis is a bacterium from the genus Actinoplanes which has been isolated from isolated from leaf litter in Indonesia.

References 

Micromonosporaceae
Bacteria described in 2016